Uliana Dubrova (born April 3, 2002, in Kharkiv, Ukraine) is a Ukrainian short track speed skater. She competed in the 1500 metres event at the 2022 Winter Olympics where she did not advance from the heat.

Sporting career
Dubrova took up the sport in 2012. She started her international senior sporting career in late 2019 when she debuted at the World Cup. One year before that, she debuted at the World Junior Championships.

Uliana Dubrova managed to qualify for her first Winter Games in Beijing based on the performances during the 2021–22 World Cup. She finished last in her heats race.

Results

Winter Olympics

European Championships

References

External links
 Dubrova's profile
 Dubrova's statistics

2002 births
Living people
Ukrainian female short track speed skaters
Olympic short track speed skaters of Ukraine
Short track speed skaters at the 2022 Winter Olympics
Sportspeople from Kharkiv